Safe sex is sexual activity using methods or contraceptive devices (such as condoms) to reduce the risk of transmitting or acquiring sexually transmitted infections (STIs), especially HIV. "Safe sex" is also sometimes referred to as safer sex or protected sex to indicate that some safe sex practices do not eliminate STI risks. It is also sometimes used colloquially to describe methods aimed at preventing pregnancy that may or may not also lower STI risks.

The concept of "safe sex" emerged in the 1980s as a response to the global AIDS epidemic, and possibly more specifically to the AIDS crisis in the United States. Promoting safe sex is now one of the main aims of sex education and STI prevention, especially reducing new HIV infections. Safe sex is regarded as a harm reduction strategy aimed at reducing the risk of STI transmission.

Although some safe sex practices (like condoms) can also be used as birth control (contraception), most forms of contraception do not protect against STIs. Likewise, some safe sex practices, such as partner selection and low-risk sex behavior, might not be effective forms of contraception.

History

Although strategies for avoiding STIs like syphilis and gonorrhea have existed for centuries and the term "safe sex" existed in English as early as the 1930s, the use of the term to refer to STI-risk reduction dates to the mid-1980s in the United States. It emerged in response to the HIV/AIDS crisis.

A year before the HIV virus was isolated and named, the San Francisco chapter of the Sisters of Perpetual Indulgence published a small pamphlet titled Play Fair! out of concern over widespread STIs among the city's gay male population. It specifically named illnesses (Kaposi's sarcoma and pneumocystis pneumonia) that would later be understood as symptoms of advanced HIV disease (or AIDS). The pamphlet advocated a range of safe-sex practices, including abstinence, condoms, personal hygiene, use of personal lubricants, and STI testing/treatment. It took a casual, sex-positive approach while also emphasizing personal and social responsibility. In May 1983—the same month HIV was isolated and named in France—the New York City-based HIV/AIDS activists Richard Berkowitz and Michael Callen published similar advice in their booklet, How to Have Sex in an Epidemic: One Approach. Both publications included recommendations that are now standard advice for reducing STI (including HIV) risks.

Safe sex as a form of STI risk reduction appeared in journalism as early as 1984, in the British publication The Daily Intelligencer: "The goal is to reach about 50 million people with messages about safe sex and AIDS education."

Although safe sex is used by individuals to refer to protection against both pregnancy and HIV/AIDS or other STI transmissions, the term was born in response to the HIV/AIDS epidemic. It is believed that the term safe sex was used in the professional literature in 1984, in the content of a paper on the psychological effect that HIV/AIDS may have on gay and bisexual men.

A year later, the same term appeared in an article in The New York Times. This article emphasized that most specialists advised their AIDS patients to practice safe sex. The concept included limiting the number of sexual partners, using prophylactics, avoiding bodily fluid exchange, and resisting the use of drugs that reduced inhibitions for high-risk sexual behavior. Moreover, in 1985, the first safe sex guidelines were established by the 'Coalition for Sexual Responsibilities'. According to these guidelines, safe sex was practiced by using condoms also when engaging in anal or oral sex.

Although the term safe sex was primarily used in reference to sexual activity between men, in 1986 the concept was spread to the general population. Various programs were developed with the aim of promoting safe sex practices among college students. These programs were focused on promoting the use of the condom, a better knowledge about the partner's sexual history and limiting the number of sexual partners. The first book on this subject appeared in the same year. The book was entitled "Safe Sex in the Age of AIDS", and had 88 pages that described both positive and negative approaches to sexual life. Sexual behavior could be safe (kissing, hugging, massage, body-to-body rubbing, mutual masturbation, exhibitionism, phone sex, and use of separate sex toys); possibly safe (use of condoms); or unsafe.

In 1997, specialists in this matter promoted the use of condoms as the most accessible safe sex method (besides abstinence) and they called for TV commercials featuring condoms. During the same year, the Catholic Church in the United States issued their own "safer sex" guidelines on which condoms were listed, though two years later the Vatican urged chastity and heterosexual marriage, attacking the American Catholic bishops' guidelines.

A study carried out in 2006 by Californian specialists showed that the most common definitions of safe sex are condom use (68% of the interviewed subjects), abstinence (31.1% of the interviewed subjects), monogamy (28.4% of the interviewed subjects) and safe partner (18.7% of the interviewed subjects).

The term safer sex in Canada and the United States has gained greater use by health workers, reflecting that risk of transmission of sexually transmitted infections in various sexual activities is a continuum. The term safe sex is still in common use in the United Kingdom, Australia and New Zealand.

"Safer sex" is thought to be a more aggressive term which may make it more obvious to individuals that any type of sexual activity carries a certain degree of risk.

The term safe love has also been used, notably by the French Sidaction in the promotion of men's underpants incorporating a condom pocket and including the red ribbon symbol in the design, which were sold to support the charity.

Practices
A range of safe-sex practices are commonly recommended by sexual health educators and public health agencies. Many of these practices can reduce (but not eliminate) risk of transmitting or acquiring STIs.

Phone sex/cybersex/sexting
Sexual activities, such as phone sex, cybersex, and sexting, that do not include direct contact with the skin or bodily fluids of sexual partners, carry no STI risks and, thus, are forms of safe sex.

Non-penetrative sex

A range of sex acts called "non-penetrative sex" or "outercourse" can significantly reduce STI risks. Non-penetrative sex includes practices such as kissing, mutual masturbation, rubbing or stroking. According to the Health Department of Western Australia, this sexual practice may prevent pregnancy and most STIs. However, non-penetrative sex may not protect against infections that can be transmitted via skin-to-skin contact, such as herpes and human papilloma virus. Mutual or partnered masturbation carries some STI risk, especially if there is skin contact or shared bodily fluids with sexual partners, although the risks are significantly lower than many other sexual activities.

Condoms, dental dams, gloves
Barriers, such as condoms, dental dams, and medical gloves can prevent contact with body fluids (such as blood, vaginal fluid, semen, rectal mucus), and other means of transmitting STIs (like skin, hair and shared objects) during sexual activity.

 External condoms can be used to cover the penis, hands, fingers, or other body parts during sexual penetration or stimulation. They are most frequently made of latex, and can also be made out of synthetic materials including polyurethane and polyisoprene.
 Internal condoms (also called female condoms) are inserted into the vagina or anus prior to sexual penetration. These condoms are made of either polyurethane or nitrile. If external and internal condoms are used at the same time, they may break due to friction between the materials during sexual activity.
 A dental dam (originally used in dentistry) is a sheet of latex used for protection when engaging in oral sex. It is typically used as a barrier between the mouth and the vulva during cunnilingus or between the mouth and the anus during anal–oral sex.
 Medical gloves made out of latex, vinyl, nitrile, or polyurethane may be used as a makeshift dental dam during oral sex, or can cover hands, fingers, or other body parts during penetration or sexual stimulation, such as masturbation.
 Condoms, dental dams, and gloves can also be used to cover sex toys such as dildos during sexual stimulation or penetration. If a sex toy is to be used in more than one orifice or partner, a condom/dental dam/glove can be used over it and changed when the toy is moved.

Oil-based lubrication can break down the structure of latex condoms, dental dams or gloves, reducing their effectiveness for STI protection.

While use of external condoms can reduce STI risks during sexual activity, they are not 100% effective. One study has suggested condoms might reduce HIV transmission by 85% to 95%; effectiveness beyond 95% was deemed unlikely because of slippage, breakage, and incorrect use. It also said, "In practice, inconsistent use may reduce the overall effectiveness of condoms to as low as 60–70%".p. 40.

Pre-exposure prophylaxis (PrEP)

Pre-exposure prophylaxis (often abbreviated as PrEP) is the use of prescription drugs by those who do not have HIV to prevent HIV infection. PrEP drugs are taken prior to HIV exposure to prevent the transmission of the virus, usually between sexual partners. PrEP drugs do not prevent other STI infections or pregnancy.

As of 2018, the most-widely approved form of PrEP combines two drugs (tenofovir and emtricitabine) in one pill. That drug combination is sold under the brand name Truvada by Gilead Sciences. It is also sold in generic formulations worldwide. Other drugs and modalities are being studied for use as PrEP.

Different countries have approved different protocols for using the tenofovir/emtricitabine-combination drug as PrEP. That two-drug combination has been shown to prevent HIV infection in different populations when taken daily, intermittently, and on demand. Numerous studies have found the tenofovir/emtricitabine combination to be over 90% effective at preventing HIV transmission between sexual partners.

Treatment as prevention

Treatment as Prevention (often abbreviated as TasP) is the practice of testing for and treating HIV infection as a way to prevent further spread of the virus. Those having knowledge of their HIV-positive status can use safe-sex practices to protect themselves and their partners (such as using condoms, sero-sorting partners, or choosing less-risky sexual activities). And, because HIV-positive people with durably suppressed or undetectable amounts of HIV in their blood cannot transmit HIV to sexual partners, sexual activity with HIV-positive partners on effective treatment is a form of safe sex (to prevent HIV infection). This fact has given rise to the concept of "U=U" ("Undetectable = Untransmittable").

Other forms of safe sex
Other methods proven effective at reducing STI risks during sexual activity are:
 Immunization against certain sexually-transmitted viruses. The most common vaccines protect against hepatitis B and human papilloma virus (HPV), which can cause cervical cancer, penile cancer, oral cancer, and genital warts. Immunization before initiation of sexual activity increases effectiveness of these vaccines. HPV vaccines are recommended for all teen girls and women as well as teen boys and men through age 26 and 21 respectively.
 Limiting numbers of sexual partners, particularly casual sexual partners, or restricting sexual activity to those who know and share their STI status, can also reduce STI risks. Monogamy or polyfidelity, practiced faithfully, is very safe (as far as STIs are concerned) when all partners are non-infected. However, many monogamous people have been infected with sexually transmitted diseases by partners who are sexually unfaithful, have used injection drugs, or were infected by previous sexual partners. The same risks apply to polyfidelitous people, who face higher risks depending on how many people are in the polyfidelitous group.
 Communication with sexual partners about sexual history and STI status, preferred safe sex practices, and acceptable risks for partnered sexual activities.
 Engaging in less-risky sexual activities. In general, solo sexual activities are less risky than partnered activities. Sexual penetration of orifices (mouth, vagina, anus) and sharing body fluids (such as semen, blood, vaginal fluids, and rectal mucus) between sexual partners carry the most risk for STIs.
 Regular STI testing and treatment, especially by those who are sexually active with more than one casual sexual partner. It is possible to attain and show proof of STD-free-verification through online dating apps and websites.
 Penile circumcision. Some research suggests that circumcising (removing) the foreskin of the penis can reduce the risk of contracting HIV. Some advocacy groups dispute these findings.

Ineffective methods

General
Most methods of contraception are not effective at preventing the spread of STIs. This includes birth control pills, vasectomy, tubal ligation, periodic abstinence, IUDs and many non-barrier methods of pregnancy prevention. However, condoms, when used correctly, significantly reduces the risks of STI transmission and unwanted pregnancy.

The spermicide nonoxynol-9 has been claimed to reduce the likelihood of STI transmission. However, a technical report by the World Health Organization  has shown that nonoxynol-9 is an irritant and can produce tiny tears in mucous membranes, which may increase the risk of transmission by offering pathogens more easy points of entry into the system. They reported that nonoxynol-9 lubricant do not have enough spermicide to increase contraceptive effectiveness cautioned they should not be promoted. There is no evidence that spermicidal condoms are better at preventing STD transmission compared to condoms that do not have spermicide. If used properly, spermicidal condoms can prevent pregnancy, but there is still an increased risk that nonoxynyl-9 can irritate the skin, making it more susceptible for infections.

The use of a diaphragm or contraceptive sponge provides some women with better protection against certain sexually transmitted diseases, but they are not effective for all STIs.

Hormonal methods of preventing pregnancy (such as oral contraceptives [i.e. 'The pill'], depoprogesterone, hormonal IUDs, the vaginal ring, and the patch) offer no protection against STIs. The copper intrauterine device and the hormonal intrauterine device provide an up to 99% protection against pregnancies but no protection against STIs. Women with copper intrauterine device may be subject to greater risk of infection from bacterial infectious such as gonorrhea or chlamydia, although this is debated.

Coitus interruptus (or "pulling out"), in which the penis is removed from the vagina, anus, or mouth before ejaculation, may reduce transmission of STIs but still carries significant risk. This is because pre-ejaculate, a fluid that oozes from the penile urethra before ejaculation, may contain STI pathogens. Additionally, the microbes responsible for some diseases, including genital warts and syphilis, can be transmitted through skin-to-skin or mucous membrane contact.

Anal sex
Unprotected anal penetration is considered a high-risk sexual activity because the thin tissues of the anus and rectum can be easily damaged.  Slight injuries can allow the passage of bacteria and viruses, including HIV. This includes penetration of the anus by fingers, hands, or sex toys such as dildos. Also, condoms may be more likely to break during anal sex than during vaginal sex, increasing the risk of STI transmission.

The main risk which individuals are exposed to when performing anal sex is the transmission of HIV. Other possible infections include hepatitis A, B and C; intestinal parasite infections like Giardia; and bacterial infections such as Escherichia coli.

Anal sex should be avoided by couples in which one of the partners has been diagnosed with an STI until the treatment has proven to be effective.

In order to make anal sex safer, the couple must ensure that the anal area is clean and the bowel empty and the partner on whom anal penetration occurs should be able to relax. Regardless of whether anal penetration occurs by using a finger or the penis, the condom is the best barrier method to prevent transmission of STI. Enemas should not be used as they can increase the risk of HIV infection and lymphogranuloma venereum proctitis.

Since the rectum can be easily damaged, the use of lubricants is highly recommended even when penetration occurs by using the finger. Especially for beginners, using a condom on the finger is both a protection measure against STI and a lubricant source. Most condoms are lubricated and they allow less painful and easier penetration. Oil-based lubricants damage latex and should not be used with condoms; water-based and silicone-based lubricants are available instead. Non-latex condoms are available for people who are allergic to latex made out of polyurethane or polyisoprene. Polyurethane condoms can safely be used with oil-based lubricant. The "female condom" may also be used effectively by the anal receiving partner.

Anal stimulation with a sex toy requires similar safety measures to anal penetration with a penis, in this case using a condom on the sex toy in a similar way.

It is important that the man washes and cleans his penis after anal intercourse if he intends to penetrate the vagina. Bacteria from the rectum are easily transferred to the vagina, which may cause vaginal and urinary tract infections.

When anal-oral contact occurs, protection is required since this is a risky sexual behavior in which illnesses as hepatitis A or STIs can be easily transmitted, as well as enteric infections. The dental dam or plastic wrap are effective protection means whenever anilingus is performed.

Sex toys

Putting a condom on a sex toy provides better sexual hygiene and can help to prevent transmission of infections if the sex toy is shared, provided the condom is replaced when used by a different partner. Some sex toys are made of porous materials, and pores retain viruses and bacteria, which makes it necessary to clean sex toys thoroughly, preferably with use of cleaners specifically for sex toys. Glass is non-porous and medical grade glass sex toys more easily sterilized between uses.

In cases in which one of the partners is treated for an STI, it is recommended that the couple not use sex toys until the treatment has proved to be effective.

All sex toys have to be properly cleaned after use. The way in which a sex toy is cleaned varies on the type of material it is made of. Some sex toys can be boiled or cleaned in a dishwasher. Most of the sex toys come with advice on the best way to clean and store them and these instructions should be carefully followed. A sex toy should be cleaned not only when it is shared with other individuals but also when it is used on different parts of the body (such as mouth, vagina or anus).

A sex toy should regularly be checked for scratches or breaks that can be breeding ground for bacteria. It is best if the damaged sex toy is replaced by a new undamaged one. Even more hygiene protection should be considered by pregnant women when using sex toys. Sharing any type of sex toy that may draw blood, like whips or needles, is not recommended, and is not safe.

When using sex toys in the anus, sex toys "...can easily get lost" as "rectal muscles contract and can suck an object up and up, potentially obstructing the colon"; to prevent this serious problem, sex toy users are advised to use sex "...toys with a flared base or a string".

Abstinence
Sexual abstinence reduces STIs and pregnancy risks associated with sexual contact, but STIs may also be transmitted through non-sexual means, or by rape. HIV may be transmitted through contaminated needles used in tattooing, body piercing, or injections. Medical or dental procedures using contaminated instruments can also spread HIV, while some health-care workers have acquired HIV through occupational exposure to accidental injuries with needles. Evidence does not support the use of abstinence-only sex education. Abstinence-only sex education programs have been found to be ineffective in decreasing rates of HIV infection in the developed world and unplanned pregnancy. Abstinence-only sex education primarily relies on the consequences of character and morality while health care professionals are concerned about matters regarding health outcomes and behaviors. Though abstinence is the best course to prevent pregnancy and STIs, in reality, it leaves young people without the information and skills they need to avoid unwanted pregnancies and STIs.

See also 

 Bareback (sex)
 Celibacy
 Masturbation
 Human sexual activity
 Misconceptions about HIV/AIDS
 Party and play
 Post-exposure prophylaxis
 Sisters of Perpetual Indulgence
 Terrence Higgins Trust

References

External links 

 "Prevention - Sexually Transmitted Disease, AGUM (Association of Genital Urinary Medicine) 
 "Guidelines", British Association for Sexual health and HIV (BASHH)

Birth control
HIV/AIDS
Prevention
Sexual health
Sex education
Prevention of HIV/AIDS
Harm reduction